Wu Shih-yi (born 27 April 1998) is a Taiwanese boxer.

Wu began boxing at the age of thirteen. Wu completed in boxing at the 2018 Asian Games in the women's 60 kg, losing to eventual silver medalist Sudaporn Seesondee. At the 2018 AIBA Women's World Boxing Championships, Wu contested as a lightweight, losing to Karina Ibragimova. Wu earned a silver medal at the 2019 Asian Amateur Boxing Championships in April, then lost to Wang Cong in the October 2019 AIBA Women's World Boxing Championships, which she contested as a lightweight. In March 2020, Wu qualified to represent Chinese Taipei in the 2020 Summer Olympics.

References

1998 births
Living people
Taiwanese women boxers
Olympic boxers of Taiwan
Boxers at the 2018 Asian Games
Asian Games competitors for Chinese Taipei
Boxers at the 2020 Summer Olympics
Lightweight boxers
21st-century Taiwanese women